A  is a Georgian calligraphic signature, monogram or seal, originally used by the Georgian monarchs, queens consort, patriarchs, royalty and nobility.<ref>საგამომცემლო ლექსიკონი/ავტ.-შემდგ.: ვახტანგ დოხნაძე; [რედ.: მურმან სუხიშვილი ; მხატვ.: ვახტანგ რურუა]. - [მე-2 შესწ. და შევს. გამოც.]. - თბ.: საგამომც. საქმის სასწ. ცენტრი, 2006. - 305გვ.; 20სმ.. - ბიბლიოგრ.: გვ. 301–304. (Publishing dictionary, edited by: Vakhtang Dokhnadze; Ed. Murman Sukhishvili; Artist: Vakhtang Rurua, Case Study Center, 2006. Bibliography: p. 301–304. -  : [ფ.ა.]{</ref>ეროვნულ არქივში XI – XVIII საუკუნეების დოკუმენტებზე არსებული ხელრთვების კატალოგი მომზადდა (A catalog of carvings on documents of the XI - XVIII centuries in the National Archives)  National Archives of Georgia

The word  literally means 'to decorate, adorn or beautify with hand' in Georgian,  meaning a hand and  meaning to decorate or adorn.

Every Georgian monarch had their own individual  and was known as  literally meaning 'Hand of the Lord'.

Khelrtvas
Kings

Queens regnant

Queens consort

Patriarchs

Presidents, Prime Ministers, Speakers

See also
 Huaya, stylised calligraphic signatures used in East Asia
 Tughra, stylised Arabic signatures used by Ottoman sultans

References

External links
 ჯიმშერ რეხვიაშვილი ხელრთვა - ისტორიისა და ხელნაწერის მშვენება (Jimsher Rekhviashvili - The Beauty of History and Manuscript) Radio Free Europe/Radio Liberty
 ოთხი რესტავრირებული ეტრატი "განადგურებას გადარჩენილი საბუთები საცავში ბრუნდება" თამარ კიკნაველიძე, 24 საათი (Four Restored Etrats Documents Surviving the Destruction Returned to the Repository, Tamar Kiknavelidze'')

Georgian words and phrases
Georgian calligraphy
Signature
Monograms